Colobothea poecila is a species of beetle in the family Cerambycidae. It was described by Ernst Friedrich Germar in 1824. It is known from Argentina, Brazil, and Paraguay.

References

poecila
Beetles described in 1824